PDB is a container format for record databases in Palm OS, Garnet OS and Access Linux Platform. Its structure is similar to PRC resource databases. The PalmDOC eBook format is a special version of the PDB format.

Structure of PDB file 
A PDB file contains a PDB header, PDB record headers and records.

PDB Header 
The PDB header is located at the beginning of the file and contains meta-information on the file:

PDB Record Header 
For every record, there is an eight byte record header, containing:

PDB Records 
Now the records themselves follow. The usual order is AppInfoArea, SortInfoArea and records, sequentially.

PDB Datetimes 

Many PDB format files used times counting in seconds from 1904-01-01T00:00:00. This is the base time used by the original Macintosh (up to Mac OS 9).  It may be noted that there were close links between Palm OS and Mac OS during early development. Using an unsigned 32-bit integer and the 1904 epoch, integer overflow will overflow will occur sometime in 2040.  

Others may be observed to be counting from 1970-01-01T00:00:00 (the Unix epoch base time), and uses a signed 32-bit integer which will overflow sometime in 2038.

Palm OS Protein C/C++ Compiler Language & Library Reference, Copyright 2004 Palm Source calls the dates calculated from 1904 "old Palm epoch", and the dates calculated from 1970 "UNIX epoch".  Protein C also provides functions (palm_seconds_to_time_t(), and time_t_to_palm_seconds() ) for converting between the two.

Some sources even suggest some very old files may use times counting from 1900 (which would be consistent with the Excel epoch).

This conflict between old Palm (Mac OS 9) epoch and UNIX epoch is unfortunate, the following heuristic may be useful when examining a file copied from a Palm OS device:

 If the time has the top bit set, it's an unsigned 32-bit number counting from 1st Jan 1904
 If the time has the top bit clear, it's a signed 32-bit number counting from 1st Jan 1970. 

This is based on the idea that, otherwise the time would be before 1972 or before 1970 (depending on the interpretation) and the PDB format wasn't around then.

The palmdump utility and other software uses this rule-of-thumb when reading files.

See also 
 PRC format

References 

Computer file formats
Palm OS